The 1982 Porsche Tennis Grand Prix was a women's singles tennis tournament played on indoor carpet courts at the Tennis Sporthalle Filderstadt in Filderstadt in West Germany. The event was part of the Category 4 tier of the 1982 Toyota Series. It was the fifth edition of the tournament and was held from 18 October through 24 October 1982. First-seeded Martina Navratilova won the singles event and the accompanying $22,000 first-prize money.

Finals

Singles
 Martina Navratilova defeated  Tracy Austin 6–3, 6–3
It was Navratilova's 12th singles title of the year and the 67th of her career.

Doubles
 Martina Navratilova /  Pam Shriver defeated  Candy Reynolds /  Anne Smith 6–2, 6–3

Prize money

Notes

References

External links
 
 International Tennis Federation (ITF) tournament event details

Porsche Tennis Grand Prix
1982 in German tennis
Porsche Tennis Grand Prix
1980s in Baden-Württemberg
Porsch